Arbër Deliu (born 1 April 2000) is an Albanian professional footballer who  plays as a centre-back for Albanian club KF Laçi.

References

External links

Arbër Deliu at FSHF

2000 births
Living people
Footballers from Kavajë
Footballers from Durrës
Albanian footballers
Association football defenders
Besa Kavajë players
KF Laçi players
Kategoria Superiore players
Kategoria e Parë players